The gens Ofania was a minor plebeian family at Rome.  Members of this gens known almost entirely from inscriptions.

Origin
The nomen Ofanius belongs to a class of gentilicia apparently formed from cognomina ending in -anus, or place-names ending in -anum, although in this case neither a surname Ofanus nor a place called Ofanum is known.

Members

 Gaius Ofanius, named in an inscription from Nursia in Samnium.
 Lucius Ofanius L. l., a freedman named in an inscription from Rome.
 Titus Ofanius T. f., named in an inscription from the present site of Spilamberto, a village just south of Mutina in northern Italy.
 Ofania Sex. l. Alexandria, a freedwoman named in a dedicatory inscription from Rome.
 Marcus Ofanius Aristionis, built a funerary monument at Rome for himself and his son, Marcus Ofanius Primus.
 Sextus Ofanius Eros, perhaps the former master of Ofania Alexandria, named in an inscription from Rome.
 Ofanius Hyginus, dedicated a monument at Peltuinum in Samnium to his brother, Quintus Tattius Vestinus, and his wife, Alledia.
 Ofania Januaria, dedicated a monument at Misenum to her friend, the soldier Valerius Saturninus, who died aged twenty-eight.
 Marcus Ofanius M. f. Primus, buried at Rome with his father, Marcus Ofanius Aristonis.
 Ofania C. f. Quarta, the wife of Gaius Papirius Masso.  Her husband served as military tribune, plebeian aedile, quaesitor judex and curator frumenti.
 Gaius Ofanius C. f. Valens Cyrro, a soldier in the fifteenth legion, buried at Carnuntum, aged thirty, having served eight years.

See also
 List of Roman gentes

References

Bibliography
 Theodor Mommsen et alii, Corpus Inscriptionum Latinarum (The Body of Latin Inscriptions, abbreviated CIL), Berlin-Brandenburgische Akademie der Wissenschaften (1853–present).
 René Cagnat et alii, L'Année épigraphique (The Year in Epigraphy, abbreviated AE), Presses Universitaires de France (1888–present).
 George Davis Chase, "The Origin of Roman Praenomina", in Harvard Studies in Classical Philology, vol. VIII (1897).
 Paul von Rohden, Elimar Klebs, & Hermann Dessau, Prosopographia Imperii Romani (The Prosopography of the Roman Empire, abbreviated PIR), Berlin (1898).
 Annona Epigraphica Austriaca (Epigraphy of Austria Annual, abbreviated AEA) (1979–present).

Roman gentes